Diisobutyl phthalate (DIBP) is a phthalate ester having the structural formula . It is formed by the esterification of isobutanol and phthalic anhydride. This and other phthalates are used as plasticizers due to their flexibility and durability. They are found in many industrial and personal products, such as lacquers, nail polish and cosmetics. DIBP can be absorbed via oral ingestion and dermal exposition. When it comes to excretion, DIBP is first converted into the hydrolytic monoester monoisobutyl phthalate (MIBP). The primary excretory route is urine, with biliary excretion being noted in minor amounts. DIBP has lower density and freezing point than the related compound dibutyl phthalate (DBP).

History 

In 1836 French chemist Auguste Laurent oxidized naphthalene with chromic acid and created phthalic anhydride, of which phthalates are derived. Phthalates, including DIBP, were first introduced in the 1920s to make plastics more flexible, transparent and long-lived. They increased their popularity in 1931 when polyvinylchloride (PVC) became commercially available. Due to the increase in human exposition to phthalates, in 1999 the European Union restricted the use of some of them in children’s toys.

Legislation

Industry use 
It is used as an plasticizer additive in a range of plastic and rubber materials. It has low volatility, which makes it ideal for use in products that require long-lasting flexibility, e.g. automotive parts, wire and cable insulation, and flooring. It is dense and water-insoluble.

DIBP has been found to be relatively non-toxic, but high levels of exposure to the compound may cause irritation to the eyes, skin and respiratory tract. However, in recent years, concerns have been raised about the potential health risks of exposure to phthalates, including DIBP. Therefore, several countries have restricted or even banned the use of certain phthalates in products. DIBP has been detected in various environmental matrices, such as air, water, and sediment. DIBP is known to bioaccumulate in certain aquatic species

Synthesis 
DIBP is synthesized by a double nucleophilic acyl substitution reaction between phthalic anhydride and isobutanol, using various acids as a catalyst, such as sulfuric acid, sulfonated graphene, or iron(III) chloride. Water is a byproduct.

Using sulfuric acid, the yield is 61% yield.

Optimization 
Sulfonated graphene is a heterogeneous catalyst that has several advantages over traditional liquid acids like sulfuric acid. Sulfonated graphene can be easily separated from the reaction mixture by filtration and can be reused multiple times without reduction in activity. Furthermore, sulfonated graphene is environmentally friendly, as it does not produce hazardous waste materials that are typically generated during the use of traditional liquid acid catalysts. This method has a 95% yield.

The Lewis acid catalysis process can be run at lower lower temperatures (50-100 °C), and gives a yield of 86%.

Available forms 
Diisobutyl phthalate is clear, colourless, oily liquid form with a mild odor. It is insoluble in water but soluble in many organic solvents.

DIBP can be sold as a pure substance or as a component of mixtures with other phthalate plasticizers or chemicals. Examples are dioctyl phthalate (DOP), diisononyl-phthalate (DINP), or bis(2-ethylhexyl) phthalate (DEHP). It may be used as a component in formulations of several products including adhesives, paints, coatings and lubricants. DIBP also may be present in consumer products such as toys, vinyl flooring, food packaging, and as a plasticizer or as a component of plastic formulations. In many of these products DIBP is now prohibited to be used in formulations according to REACH.

Environmental reactions 

DIBP can undergo various reactions that may impact the environment. Examples include:

 Hydrolysis: Hydrolyzation of DIBP can be done by enzymes, bacteria, and other microorganisms in the environment to form phthalic acid and isobutyl alcohol. This can lead to the breakdown and the eventual degradation of DIBP in the soil and water supply 
 Photodegradation: DIBP can undergo photodegradation by exposure to the sunlight. This can lead to the formation of several degradation products, including phthalic acid, isobutyraldehyde, and other aldehydes.
 Biodegradation: DIBP can be degraded by microorganisms in soil and in the water. This can transform it into other compounds such as phthalic acid and various isobutyl alcohol derivatives. 
 Sorption: DIBP can adsorb or sorb onto soil and sediment particles, which can limit its mobility and availability for biological or chemical degradations and reactions.
 Oxidation: DIBP can be oxidized in the presence of ozone or other reactive oxygen species. The formation of various oxidation products, including aldehydes, ketones, and carboxylic acids can be expected 

These reactions can impact the persistence, bioaccumulation, and toxicity in the environment and may have implications for human and ecosystem health.

Mechanims of actions

PPARγ Pathway 
The effects of DiBP exposure are mainly realized through its activation of peroxisome proliferator-activated receptor gamma (PPARγ). PPARs are ligand-activated nuclear transcription factors, the family consists of PPARα, PPARβ/δ and PPARγ. There are two isoforms of PPARγ, PPARγ2 is mainly present on cells in adipose tissue, whereas PPARγ1 is found on multiple cells like those in the gut, brain, blood vessels, and some immune and inflammatory cells. Transcriptional regulation through PPARs requires the formation of a heterodimer with retinoid X receptor (RXR). Upon activation by DiBP this PPARγ/RXR heterodimer binds to a DNA sequence called the PPAR response element (PPRE). Binding of the transcription factor to this response element can result in either up- or down-regulation of genes. PPARγ is involved in lipid metabolism and storage as well as glucose metabolism through improving insulin sensitivity, so binding of DiBP leads to altered leptin and insulin levels. DiBP also leads to a down-regulation of proteins involved in steroid production, resulting in higher levels of androgenic hormones.

Cytokine-cytokine receptor pathway 
Another type of pathway affected by DiBP exposure is the cytokine-cytokine receptor pathway. There are two pathways affected: the tumour necrosis factor receptor superfamily (TNFRSF) and the prolactin receptor pathway, both of which affect spermatogenesis. In zebra fish, there are two types of TNFRSF: tnfrsf1a and tnfrsf1b, the latter of which is down-regulated by DiBP. Tnfrsf1b is involved in regeneration and tissue repair and its down-regulation has been shown to increase apoptosis of sperm cells. Prolactin (PLR) on the other hand is up-regulated as a result of DiBP exposure. Prolactin has many roles, including roles in cell regeneration and regulation of the male reproductive system. High PLR concentrations as a result of phthalate exposure has been linked to reduced sperm concentrations in both adult men and zebra fish.

Metabolism 

Upon entering circulation DiBP is quickly metabolized and excreted through urine, with metabolites reaching peak concentrations 2-4 hours after administration. The main metabolite of DiBP is mono-isobutyl phthalate (MiBP), which makes up 70% of the excretion products. MiBP can be oxidized to either 2OH-mono-isobutyl phthalate (2OH-MiBP) or 3OH-mono-isobutyl phthalate (3OH-MiBP), which make up 20% and 1% of the excretion products respectively. These reactions are likely catalyzed by cytochrome P450 in the liver. The ratio between MiBP and the oxidized metabolites changes depending on the amount of time that has passed since exposure. The ratio between MiBP and 2OH-MiBP and that between MiBP and 3OH-MiBP show a similar trend. With the ratios being high, around 20-30:1, shortly after exposure and dropping gradually as more time passes to rest around 2-5:1. Therefore, a high ratio of oxidized metabolites to the monoester metabolite suggests that there was recent exposure to DiBP, within a few hours of measuring, while a lower ratio suggests that there has been more time since exposure. In addition to oxidation, MiBP can also undergo a glucuronidation reaction, resulting in the metabolite MiBP-glucuronide.

Toxicity 

There’s insufficient data to determine if DIBP is associated with acute dermal or inhalation toxicity, eye or dermal irritation, or sensitization. There is evidence on DIBP being a subchronic toxicant. Exposure to the compound can induce changes in body weight, liver weight, reproductive effects, and developmental effects like testicular weight, spermatogenesis, fetal body weight, anogenital distance in male and female rats, and testicular testosterone production, among others. 

Biomonitoring studies show that exposures to DIBP have grown recently, presumably as a result of DIBPs use as a substitute for other phthalates such as dibutyl phthalate (DBP) in plastics. In the United States, for instance, the prevalence of MIBP detection in urine has risen from 72% of the general population in 2001–2002 to 96% in 2009–2010, according to data from the National Health and Nutrition Examination Survey (NHANES). 

The main issue with phthalate exposure is typically male reproductive toxicity, which is a risk that many phthalates share.

Effect on animals 

A study conducted on rats shows that high dosage of DIBP administered by gavage to pregnant female rats between gestational days (GD) 6 and 20, exhibited signs of embryotoxicity and teratogenicity. The growing male reproductive system was negatively impacted by DIBP, which is typical for phthalate esters. When phthalates are exposed in utero during the process of male sexual differentiation, a phenotype known as "phthalate syndrome" is created. This syndrome is characterized by underdevelopment of the male reproductive system, decreased anogenital distance (AGD), retention of the nipple in a female-like manner, and germ cell toxicity, among other things. Therefore, these effects can be connected to decreased insulin-like-3 (INSL3) hormone, which controls transabdominal testicular descent, decreased androgen production in the testicles, which is essential for male sexual development, and disruption of seminiferous cord formation, Sertoli cells, and germ cell development via an unknown mode of action (MOA). 

Despite the limited studies in other species, research on zebrafish  shows that environmental exposure to DBP and DIBP can have serious consequences for fish offspring. As they go up the food chain and into polluted water, these phthalates can build up in aquatic organisms. Fish are susceptible to environmental toxins in their early lives, whether they are exposed to them directly or indirectly through their parents.

See also 
 Phthalates
 Dibutyl phthalate
 Phthalic anhydride
 Isobutanol

References

External links 
 

Phthalate esters
Plasticizers